Begonia roxburghii is a species of plant in the family Begoniaceae.

The Latin specific epithet roxburghii refers to the Scottish Botanist William Roxburgh.

References

 Pharmacographia India page 40

roxburghii